Alistair Rutherford, known more widely as The Running Viola, is a British athlete, musician and television personality. He is a current double Guinness World Record holder for the fastest marathon and the fastest half marathon dressed as a musical instrument.

Career
Originally from Liverpool, Rutherford studied as a violist at the Royal Birmingham Conservatoire, graduating in 2017. The concept of The Running Viola came to him as an idea to raise money for arco, a charity providing musical education for children in South Africa in conjunction with Birmingham City University and the Morris Isaacson Centre for Music. He has since become the manager of the project.

References

1995 births
Living people
British classical violists
British male long-distance runners
British male marathon runners